Gary Hudson (born March 26, 1956) is an American-Canadian actor.

Early life
Hudson was born on March 26, 1956, in Newport News, Virginia, and raised in historic Hilton Village, where his father was also born. He left Virginia in 1977 after attending Christopher Newport College for two years to pursue his acting career in Los Angeles. His first acting job was in the film Hooper starring Burt Reynolds.

Career
From there Hudson's career began, and has led to numerous work in films, TV shows, stage, producing and directing. His credits include series regular roles on Safe at Home, As the World Turns, Paradise Falls, in 1990 Santa Barbara as Blackie Simpson and the 2009 Canadian TV series Wild Roses in Calgary, Canada, where he was nominated for Best Actor at the Monte-Carlo Television Festival. He recurred on Smallville, Dynasty, The Adventures of Brisco County, Jr., The Tracey Ullman Show, Air America and L.A. Heat.

His guest appearances are numerous including Cold Case, ER, Missing, Mike Hammer, Doc, Too Close for Comfort, Mama's Family, Three's Company, Matt Houston, The Facts of Life and Hotel among others.

Hudson has starred in over 30 films and worked with numerous Oscar and Emmy winners. His films include the cult classic Road House with Patrick Swayze, Battle in Seattle with Charlize Theron and Woody Harrelson, After Alice with Kiefer Sutherland, She's Too Young with Marcia Gay Harden, All-American Girl: The Mary Kay Letourneau Story with Mercedes Ruehl and Penelope Ann Miller, Jasper, Texas with Jon Voight and Louis Gossett Jr., A Season on the Brink with Brian Dennehy, Love Thy Neighbor, Deception with Dina Meyer, Perfect Sport and Cheyenne among others.

Personal life
For the last 14 years, Hudson has split up his time between the United States and Canada. He later became a Canadian citizen and spends time in the Great White North in the northern border of the United States.

Hudson has 9 nieces and nephews.

Filmography

Film

Television

Video games

References

External links

1956 births
American male film actors
Christopher Newport University alumni
People from Newport News, Virginia
American male television actors
American male voice actors
American expatriates in Canada
American emigrants to Canada
Canadian male voice actors
Canadian male film actors
Canadian male television actors
Living people